Daniel Parker (November 20, 1726 - December 31, 1785) was an American silversmith, active in Boston.

Life 
Parker was born in Charlestown, Massachusetts to Isaac and Grace (Hall) Parker, where he married Margaret Jarvis on October 8, 1751. From 1748-1775 he worked as a gold- and silversmith in Boston, where he advertised 1750-1770 in the Boston Gazette as a goldsmith. He also advertised a theft in the Gazette, 1759, of " "Three large Silver Spoons stamp'd D.Parker, 12 Tea Spoons, most of them stamp'd D.P., 3 pair Silver Tea Tongs, not stamp'd, one large Gold Locket ... 14 pair large open-work'd Silver Shoe Buckles with Steel Chapes....". He subsequently advertised in 1761 that he was robbed again, and reported the availability of jewelry and goldsmiths' tools from "his Shop near the Golden Ball." From 1763-1767 he advertised his Union Street address and that his tools included "Forging & raising anvils for tankards, canns & creampots," and "Death head & heart in hand ring swages." Apparently he also worked around 1775 as a gold- and silversmith in Salem, Massachusetts.

Parker's works are collected in the Harvard University Art Museums, Museum of Fine Arts, Boston, and Yale University Art Gallery.

References 
 "Daniel Parker", American Silversmiths.
 American Silversmiths and Their Marks IV, Stephen Guernsey Cook Ensko, D.R. Godine, 1989, page 156.
 American Church Silver of the Seventeenth and Eighteenth Centuries: With a Few Pieces of Domestic Plate, Exhibited at the Museum of Fine Arts, July to December, 1911, Museume of Fine Arts, Boston, 1911, pages 97-98.
 American Silver: From the Colonial Period Through the Early Republic in the Worcester Art Museum, Kathryn C. Buhler, Worcester Art Museum, 1979, page 32.
 "Snuff box by Daniel Parker", Yale University Art Gallery.

American silversmiths
1726 births
1785 deaths